Benkert is a surname, and may refer to:

 Franz Georg Benkert (1790–1859), German Roman Catholic theologian and historical writer
 Heinie Benkert (1901–1972), American football player
 Joseph Benkert, United States Naval officer and George W. Bush administration official
 Karl-Maria Benkert, aka Karl-Maria Kertbeny (1824–1882) Austrian-born Hungarian journalist, memoirist and human rights campaigner, coiner of "homosexual" 
 Kurt Benkert (born 1995), American football player